Hamid Rana is a Pakistani stage and television actor who also appears in Lollywood movies. In the 1980s, he played the leading role in TV drama serial Sona Chandi (Urdu: سونا چاندی) - one of the classic drama serials produced by PTV. It created two unforgettable characters in the form of Sona and Chandi.

Early life and career

He is from the city of Arifwala in Pakpattan District, Punjab. "There have been numerous plays produced by Pakistan Television Corporation that became so popular that even three decades down the road, they are still remembered with as much appreciation. Most of these plays were so engaging in terms of their storylines and acting that they ended up becoming a part of people's everyday lives. One such play was 'Sona Chandi', a play about a village-dwelling couple who come to the city in view of the debts their family needs to clear."

Hamid Rana also acted in another comedy play by the name of 'Ya Naseeb Clinic' during the black and white television era.

In 2011, Hamid Rana has completed his first drama project titled Girja, under Rana Productions.

See also 
 List of Lollywood actors
 Sona Chandi

References

Year of birth missing (living people)
Living people
Punjabi people
Pakistani male stage actors
Pakistani Sunni Muslims
People from Arifwala
Pakistani male television actors
20th-century Pakistani male actors